The Women's individual pursuit event of the 2016 UCI Track Cycling World Championships was held on 2 March 2016. Rebecca Wiasak of Australia won gold.

Results

Qualifying
The qualifying was started at 14:27.

Finals
The finals were started at 19:05.

References

Women's individual pursuit
UCI Track Cycling World Championships – Women's individual pursuit